Convergence in measure is either of two distinct mathematical concepts both of which generalize
the concept of convergence in probability.

Definitions
Let  be measurable functions on a measure space . The sequence  is said to converge globally in measure to  if for every ,

,

and to converge locally in measure to  if for every  and every  with
,

.

On a finite measure space, both notions are equivalent.  Otherwise, convergence in measure can refer to either global convergence in measure or local convergence in measure, depending on the author.

Properties
Throughout, f and fn (n  N) are measurable functions X → R.

 Global convergence in measure implies local convergence in measure.  The converse, however, is false; i.e., local convergence in measure is strictly weaker than global convergence in measure, in general.
 If, however,  or, more generally, if f and all the fn vanish outside some set of finite measure, then the distinction between local and global convergence in measure disappears.
 If μ is σ-finite and (fn) converges (locally or globally) to f in measure, there is a subsequence converging to f almost everywhere. The assumption of σ-finiteness is not necessary in the case of global convergence in measure.
 If μ is σ-finite, (fn) converges to f locally in measure if and only if every subsequence has in turn a subsequence that converges to f almost everywhere.
 In particular, if (fn) converges to f almost everywhere, then (fn) converges to f locally in measure.  The converse is false.
 Fatou's lemma and the monotone convergence theorem hold if almost everywhere convergence is replaced by (local or global) convergence in measure.
 If μ is σ-finite, Lebesgue's dominated convergence theorem also holds if almost everywhere convergence is replaced by (local or global) convergence in measure.
 If X = [a,b] ⊆ R and μ is Lebesgue measure, there are sequences (gn) of step functions and (hn) of continuous functions converging globally in measure to f. 
 If f and fn (n ∈ N) are in Lp(μ) for some p > 0 and (fn) converges to f in the p-norm, then (fn) converges to f globally in measure. The converse is false.
 If fn converges to f in measure and gn converges to g in measure then fn + gn converges to f + g in measure. Additionally, if the measure space is finite, fngn also converges to fg.

Counterexamples
Let , μ be Lebesgue measure, and f the constant function with value zero.

 The sequence  converges to f locally in measure, but does not converge to f globally in measure.
Hence (fn) fails to converge to f almost everywhere.

 The sequence  converges to f almost everywhere and globally in measure, but not in the p-norm for any .

Topology 
There is a topology, called the topology of (local) convergence in measure, on the collection of measurable functions from X such that local convergence in measure corresponds to convergence on that topology.
This topology is defined by the family of pseudometrics
 
where
 .
In general, one may restrict oneself to some subfamily of sets F (instead of all possible subsets of finite measure). It suffices that for each  of finite measure and  there exists F in the family such that  When , we may consider only one metric , so the topology of convergence in finite measure is metrizable. If  is an arbitrary measure finite or not, then
 
still defines a metric that generates the global convergence in measure.

Because this topology is generated by a family of pseudometrics, it is uniformizable.
Working with uniform structures instead of topologies allows us to formulate uniform properties such as
Cauchyness.

See also

 Convergence space

References

 D.H. Fremlin, 2000. Measure Theory. Torres Fremlin.
 H.L. Royden, 1988. Real Analysis. Prentice Hall.
 G. B. Folland 1999, Section 2.4.  Real Analysis. John Wiley & Sons.

Measure theory
Measure, Convergence in
Lp spaces